Cedric James Gordon MacLeod (26 November 1899 – 4 December 1967) was an Australian rules footballer who played with Richmond in the Victorian Football League (VFL).

Notes

External links 

Cedric MacLeod's playing statistics from The VFA Project

1899 births
1967 deaths
Australian rules footballers from South Australia
Australian Rules footballers: place kick exponents
Richmond Football Club players
Footscray Football Club (VFA) players
Prahran Football Club players